The Slovenia men's national under-18 ice hockey team is the men's national under-18 ice hockey team of Slovenia. The team is controlled by the Ice Hockey Federation of Slovenia, a member of the International Ice Hockey Federation. The team represents Slovenia at the IIHF World U18 Championships.

International competitions

IIHF World U18 Championships

1999: 2nd in Division I Europe
2000: 3rd in Division I Europe
2001: 1st in Division II
2002: 2nd in Division I
2003: 3rd in Division I Group A
2004: 2nd in Division I Group A
2005: 2nd in Division I Group A
2006: 2nd in Division I Group A
2007: 2nd in Division I Group A
2008: 6th in Division I Group A

2009: 2nd in Division II Group A
2010: 1st in Division II Group B
2011: 2nd in Division I Group B
2012: 5th in Division I A
2013: 6th in Division I A
2014: 3rd in Division I B
2015: 2nd in Division I B
2016: 4th in Division I A
2017: 1st in Division I B

External links
Slovenia at IIHF.com

under
National under-18 ice hockey teams